"La Gozadera" (Spanish term meaning a "good time" or "party") is a song by Cuban duo Gente de Zona as the lead single for their third studio album Visualízate. Featuring American singer Marc Anthony, it was released on April 30, 2015 by Sony Music Latin. The music video for the song was  nominated in the Videoclip Awards 2016, The music video was directed by Alejandro Pérez and filmed in Cuba while the scenes with Marc Anthony were filmed in the Dominican Republic. The song was produced by Motiff, a salsa version was also recorded which was produced by Sergio George. As of February 2022, the video has received over 1.4 billion views on YouTube.

The official remix features American rapper Pitbull.

“La Gozadera” was revealed as the official song of the 2021 Copa América tournament, with the song itself being a customized version featuring Copa América-related lyrics.

Charts

Weekly charts

Year-end charts

Certifications

Awards and nominations

In other media
"La Gozadera" was featured in 2017 Chilean animated film Condorito: La Película.

See also
List of number-one singles of 2015 (Spain)
List of Billboard number-one Latin songs of 2015

References

2015 singles
2015 songs
Gente de Zona songs
Marc Anthony songs
Number-one singles in Spain
Song recordings produced by Sergio George
Sony Music Latin singles
Spanish-language songs
Copa América official songs and anthems
2021 Copa América